{{Infobox film
| name           = The Last Days of Pompeii 
| image          = The Last Days of Pompeii (1908).webm
| caption        =
| director       = Arturo Ambrosio  Luigi Maggi 
| producer       = Arturo Ambrosio 
| writer         = Roberto Omegna
| based_on       = {{based on|'The Last Days of Pompeii1834 novel|Edward Bulwer-Lytton}}
| starring       = Luigi Maggi  Lydia De Roberti  Umberto Mozzato
| music          = 
| cinematography = Roberto Omegna  Giovanni Vitrotti
| editing        = 
| studio         = Ambrosio Film 
| distributor    = Ambrosio Film
| released       = December 1908
| runtime        = 17 minutes
| country        = Italy
| language       = Silent  Italian intertitles
| budget         =
}}The Last Days of Pompeii (Italian:Gli ultimi giorni di Pompeii) is a 1908 Italian silent historical film directed by Arturo Ambrosio and Luigi Maggi and starring Lydia De Roberti and Umberto Mozzato. It was loosely based on the novel of the same title by Edward Bulwer-Lytton. The film was a success on its release, and its popularity is credited with starting a fashion for epic historical films.

The film was made by the Turin-based Ambrosio Film.

 Plot 
In Pompeii 79AD, Glaucus and Jone are in love with each other. Arbaces, the Egyptian High Priest, is determined to conquer her. Glaucus buys the blind slave Nydia who is mishandled by her owner.

Nydia falls in love with Glaucus and asks Arbaces for his help. He gives her a potion to make Glaucus fall in love with her. In fact it is a poison which will destroy his mind. Ione's brother Apaecides threatens to reveal publicly his wrongdoings. Arbaces kills him and accuses Glaucus of the crime. He locks Nydia in a cellar to prevent her from speaking.

Glaucus is condemned to be thrown to the lions. Nydia manages to escape and rushes to the Circus where she arrives just as the Vesuvius starts erupting.

A widespread panic ensues and under the shock, Glaucus recovers his mind. Blind Nydia, the only one to find her way in the darkness caused by the rain of ashes, leads Glaucus and Jone to safety and finds peace by drowning herself.

Cast
 Luigi Maggi as Arbace  
 Lydia De Roberti as Nidia  
 Umberto Mozzato as Glauco 
 Ernesto Vaser as Il padrone di Nidia 
 Mirra Principi
 Cesare Gani Carini

 References 

 Bibliography 
 Brunetta, Gian Piero. The History of Italian Cinema: A Guide to Italian Film from Its Origins to the Twenty-first Century. Princeton University Press, 2009. 
 Moliterno, Gino. The A to Z of Italian Cinema''. Scarecrow Press, 2009.

External links 
 

1908 films
Italian disaster films
Italian epic films
Italian historical drama films
Italian silent short films
1900s Italian-language films
Films directed by Arturo Ambrosio
Films directed by Luigi Maggi
1900s historical drama films
Films set in ancient Rome
Films set in the Roman Empire
Films set in 79 AD
Peplum films
Pompeii in popular culture
Films based on The Last Days of Pompeii
Films about volcanoes
Italian black-and-white films
1900s disaster films
Sword and sandal films
Silent historical drama films
Silent adventure films